The 1998 McNeese State Cowboys football team was an American football team that represented McNeese State University as a member of the Southland Conference (Southland) during the 1998 NCAA Division I-AA football season. In their ninth year under head coach Bobby Keasler, the team compiled an overall record of 9–3, with a mark of 5–2 in conference play, and finished tied for second in the Southland. The Cowboys advanced to the Division I-AA playoffs and lost to UMass in the first round.

Schedule

References

McNeese State
McNeese Cowboys football seasons
McNeese State Cowboys football